Ronald Joseph Wormsbecker (born April 17, 1948) was a Canadian politician who served in the Legislative Assembly of Saskatchewan from 1991 to 1995, as a NDP member for the constituency of Weyburn.

References

Saskatchewan New Democratic Party MLAs
1948 births
Living people